The Sarazen World Open was a professional golf tournament, named in honor of seven-time major champion and hall of famer Gene Sarazen. It was held from 1994 to 1999. The field mostly consisted of national open winners from around the world from the previous two years. From 1996 to 1998, it was sponsored by Subaru and titled as the Subaru Sarazen World Open.

The Sarazen World Open was an unofficial event on the PGA Tour and for the first five years was also an approved special event on European Tour; in its final year it became an official Order of Merit event on the European Tour. It was played at Chateau Elan (Legends course) in Braselton, Georgia until 1999, when it was held at PGA Catalunya in Barcelona, Spain.

Winners

Notes

References

External links
Coverage of 1999 event on the European Tour's official site
1999 event preview

PGA Tour unofficial money events
Former European Tour events
Golf in Georgia (U.S. state)
Golf tournaments in Spain
Recurring sporting events established in 1994
Recurring sporting events disestablished in 1999
1994 establishments in Georgia (U.S. state)
1999 disestablishments in Spain